Anastrepha obliqua is a species of fruit fly. It is the most important fruit fly pest of mangoes in Neotropics and attacks a wide range of other spicy fruits. A. obliqua is widespread in Mexico, Central and South America and the West Indies. It is sometimes called the West Indian fruit fly in English.

Description 
Anastrepha obliqua is the most abundant species of Anastrepha in the West Indies and Panama. Like the Caribbean fruit fly, Anastrepha obliqua also attacks other tropical fruits of little economic importance. A. obliqua has also been called the Antillean fruit fly.

References 

Trypetinae
Insect vectors of plant pathogens